The 2013 season was Associação Portuguesa de Desportos' ninety second season in existence and the club's second consecutive season in the top flight of Brazilian football.

Players

Squad information

Youth squad

Appearances and goals

 

|-
|colspan="12"|Players who have left the club after the start of the season:

|}

Goalscorers

Last updated: 17 November 2013
Source: Match reports in Competitive matches

Transfers

In

Out

Competitions

Campeonato Brasileiro

Results summary

Results by round

League table

Matches

Source:

Copa Sudamericana

Squad

First round

Copa do Brasil

First round

Campeonato Paulista Série A2

Results summary

First stage

Matches

Second stage

Matches

Finals

References

External links
Official Site 

2013 season
Associação Portuguesa de Desportos seasons
Brazilian football clubs 2013 season